An underachiever is a person who fails to achieve their potential or does not do as well as expected by their peers.

Of particular interest is academic underachievement.  Studies of individuals who have not realized their apparent potential have identified learning disabilities, ADHD, and many other educational problems, and subsequently enabled methods of addressing these problems.  Current theories among academic scholars prefer to address underperformance problems with remedial help.  

The term is also used more generally; for example, a sports team that contains many star players but still loses games against teams with relatively little obvious talent might be termed underachieving. A stock which achieves poor profit and/or capital gains despite sound underlying business and/or assets may be called underachieving.

See also  
Achievement gap in the United States
Overachievement
Social mobility
Twice exceptional
Underearners Anonymous
Tang ping ( "lying flat")

Further reading 

 
 
 

Giftedness
Special education